Ernest P. (Tito) Vallejo (born 27 October 1948) is a Gibraltarian historian and former sergeant in the Gibraltar Regiment. He is known for his work with the Gibraltar Heritage Trust and serves as a guide in Gibraltar. He published a Llanito dictionary in 2000.

References

Gibraltarian historians
Living people
1948 births